Maigret and the Yellow Dog (French: Le Chien jaune) is a detective novel by the Belgian writer Georges Simenon.

Overview
M. Mostaguen, the wine dealer at Concarneau, is wounded by a gunshot when returning home drunk from the local Admiral Hotel and Maigret, who is organizing the mobile squad in Rennes, is called in by the mayor to solve the crime. Maigret settles down at the hotel and discovers a set of curious characters who include Jean Servières, a retired newspaper man from Paris; Ernest Michoux, a doctor who has never practiced; Emma, the mysterious and complicated waitress at the hotel, and a strange yellow dog that seems to be haunting the neighborhood. The customs official is shot in the leg, Servières disappears and is found and brought back, and a giant vagrant is arrested before Maigret solves the case.

Publishing history
The novel was originally published in French in 1931 as Le Chien jaune and published by Fayard. The first English translation, translated by Geoffrey Sainsbury, was published by George Routledge & Sons in 1939 as A Face for a Clue. It was also reissued (by Severn House)  as Maigret and the Concarneau Murders in 1980. The current translation, Maigret and the Yellow Dog, is by Linda Asher and was first published by Harcourt Brace Jovanovich in 1987 and as The Yellow Dog in London in 2003 (Penguin Books).

Adaptations

The book was first filmed in 1932 in France as The Yellow Dog. It was directed by Jean Tarride whose father Abel Tarride played Maigret.

A French TV adaptation aired on 24 February 1968 as part of the series Les enquêtes du commissaire Maigret. Jean Richard played the lead role. The same series adapted the book a second time on 13 March 1988, with Jean Richard repeating his part.

References

1931 Belgian novels
Maigret novels
Novels set in Brittany
Belgian novels adapted into films